Holly Mumby-Croft (born July 1985) is a British Conservative Party politician, serving as the Member of Parliament (MP) for Scunthorpe since 2019.

Early life 
Mumby-Croft was born in Scunthorpe.  She attended Sir John Nelthorpe School in Brigg and Brigg Sixth-Form College followed by reading English and History at Lincoln University.

Political career 
Prior to her election as an MP, Mumby-Croft was elected as a councillor for the Broughton and Appleby ward on North Lincolnshire Council in 2015, and was re-elected in May 2019 but subsequently stood down upon being elected to Parliament.

Mumby-Croft stood in Scunthorpe at the 2017 general election, and came second. She stood again  at the 2019 general election, and defeated the incumbent Labour MP Nic Dakin, winning with a 17.1% majority. This represented a 12.8% swing from Labour to Conservative.

In February 2020, Mumby-Croft praised plans to build a multi-million pound national flood training centre in Scunthorpe. Mumby-Croft made her maiden speech on 6 March 2020, and talked about the town's steel industry. She also made a commitment to increased school funding and the upgrading of Scunthorpe General Hospital.

In October 2020, Mumby-Croft was one of five Conservative MPs who broke the whip to vote for a Labour opposition day motion to extend the provision of free school meals during school holidays until Easter 2021.

Electoral history

2019 general election

2017 general election

References

External links

Living people
UK MPs 2019–present
21st-century British women politicians
Conservative Party (UK) MPs for English constituencies
Female members of the Parliament of the United Kingdom for English constituencies
Councillors in the Borough of North Lincolnshire
Conservative Party (UK) councillors
21st-century English women
21st-century English people
1985 births
Women councillors in England
Alumni of the University of Lincoln